The Palais des Sports is an arena in Brazzaville, in the Republic of the Congo. It is used for several events, like handball and concerts.

References  

Athletics (track and field) venues in the Republic of the Congo
Sports venues in the Republic of the Congo
Congo, Republic of
Stadiums of the African Games
Buildings and structures in Brazzaville
Handball venues in the Republic of the Congo
Sport in Brazzaville
Indoor arenas in the Republic of the Congo